The Tell-Tale Heart is a 1934 British drama film directed by Brian Desmond Hurst. The screenplay by David Plunkett Greene is based on the 1843 short story of the same name by Edgar Allan Poe. It is the earliest known "talkie" film adaptation of the story.

Plot 
A young manservant is driven mad by his obsession with the repulsive diseased eye of an old man who cares for him. He kills his master and hides the remains under the floorboards. When the police investigate the old man's disappearance, the imagined beating of the victim's heart haunts the murderer's thoughts so much that his words and actions arouse the suspicions of the police.

Cast 
Norman Dryden as The Boy
John Kelt as The Old Man
Yolande Terrell as The Girl

Production 
Produced by Clifton-Hurst Productions (with Harry Clifton as the listed producer), it was filmed at the Blattner Studios in Elstree, and released in the USA under the title Bucket of Blood. The film was considered so gruesome that it was withdrawn from some cinemas in the UK. The cast was mostly amateur (John Kelt had appeared in several silent films) and the dialogue is so sparse that Hurst recalled when interviewed:

See also 
List of horror films of the 1930s

References

External links 

 The Tell-Tale Heart at the website dedicated to Brian Desmond Hurst

1934 films
1934 horror films
British black-and-white films
British horror drama films
Films based on The Tell-Tale Heart
1930s horror drama films
1930s English-language films
1934 drama films
Films shot at Rock Studios
1930s British films